Vassilis Niforas (alternate spellings: Vasilis, Vasileios) (born August 2, 1991) is a Greek professional basketball player who last played for Apollon Patras of the Greek A2 Basket League. He is a 2.02 m (6 ft 7.5 in) tall power forward.

Professional career
Niforas spent the 2011–13 seasons with the Greek club Esperos Patras, playing in the semi-pro 3rd tier division of Greek basketball. In 2013, he signed with the Greek 1st Division club Apollon Patras.

References

External links
Myplayer Profile
Eurobasket.com Profile

1991 births
Living people
Greek men's basketball players
Greek Basket League players
Power forwards (basketball)
Basketball players from Patras